KASA Stadium or Karbi Anglong Sports Association (KASA) Stadium is a multi-purpose stadium at Diphu, Karbi Anglong, Assam, India. It is used mainly for football and athletic games. The stadium has capacity of 9000 spectators. The inaugural friendly football match was held here between the reigning Champions of Assam State Premier League and home team, Karbi Anglong Morning Star Football Club and the Asaduzzaman FC, Bangladesh.

Stadium
This is the home ground of current champion of Assam State Premier League Karbi Anglong Morning Star FC. It hosts the CEM Gold Cup football tournament every year which is organised jointly by Karbi Anglong Sports Association and West Karbi Anglong Sports Association and supported by Karbi Anglong Autonomous Council (KAAC). The 5th edition of the tournament was won by Karbi Anglong Morning Star FC by defeating Hyderabad FC’s reserve team 4-2 in the penalty shootout.

References

Football venues in Assam
Multi-purpose stadiums in India
Sports venues in Assam
Karbi Anglong district
2018 establishments in Assam